Erden Kıral (10 April 1942 – 17 July 2022) was a Turkish film director and screenwriter. He directed 12 films from 1978 on. His 1979 film, The Canal, was entered into the 11th Moscow International Film Festival, and his 1983 film, A Season in Hakkari, was entered into the 33rd Berlin International Film Festival, where it won the Silver Bear – Special Jury Prize. Five years later, his  film, Hunting Time, was entered into the 38th Berlin International Film Festival. He was of Georgian descent through his mother.

Selected filmography
 The Canal (1979)
 On Fertile Lands (1980)
 A Season in Hakkari (1983)
 Hunting Time (1988)
 The Blue Exile (1993)

References

External links

1942 births
2022 deaths
Turkish film directors
Turkish male screenwriters
Best Director Golden Orange Award winners
20th-century Turkish screenwriters
21st-century Turkish screenwriters
Burials at Zincirlikuyu Cemetery
Turkish people of Georgian descent
People from Gölcük